Makey-Liboli is a village in southern Ivory Coast. It is in the sub-prefecture of Grand-Lahou, Grand-Lahou Department, Grands-Ponts Region, Boli District.

Makey-Liboli was a commune until March 2012, when it became one of 1126 bolis nationwide that were abolished.

Notes

Former communes of Ivory Coast
Populated places in Lagunes District
Populated places in Grands-Ponts